Iven Carl "Kinch" Kincheloe Jr.{{efn|Iven Carl Kincheloe Jr. is on his grave marker at Arlington National Cemetery. However, his first name is sometimes spelled Ivan. The Right Stuff, however, consistently uses Iven}} (July 2, 1928 – July 26, 1958) was an American pilot. He served in the U.S. Air Force during the Korean War, in which he was recognized as a flying ace. For this suborbital flight above most of the atmosphere, he became known as "The First Spaceman". He was selected for the Air Force's program to put a man in space, but was killed in a plane crash in 1958.

Early life and education
Born July 2, 1928, in Detroit, Michigan, Kincheloe grew up in Cassopolis in the southwest part of the state, the only child of Iven C. Kincheloe Sr. (1894–1966) and Frances Wilder Kincheloe. Interested in aviation from a very young age, he graduated from Dowagiac High School in 1945 and attended Purdue University in West Lafayette, Indiana.

Kincheloe joined the Reserve Officers' Training Corps (ROTC), was a member of Sigma Phi Epsilon fraternity (Indiana Alpha), and graduated with a Bachelor of Science degree in aeronautical engineering in 1949. In the summer of 1948, the ROTC cadet met test pilot Chuck Yeager and sat in the cockpit of the Bell X-1.

Korean War
Upon graduation from college, Kincheloe received his commission as a second lieutenant in the U.S. Air Force and entered flight training. After earning his pilot wings in August 1950, he spent a year as a test pilot, flying the F-86E at Edwards Air Force Base, California, was promoted to first lieutenant, and transferred to Korea in September 1951.

During the war, he was assigned to the 25th Fighter-Interceptor Squadron, he flew F-80s on thirty combat missions and F-86s on 101 combat missions, downing five  (becoming an ace and earning the Silver Star) before returning to the U.S. in May 1952. At this time, he had reached the rank of captain.

Post-war career
After the war, Kincheloe was a gunnery instructor at Nellis Air Force Base outside Las Vegas, Nevada, then resumed his activity as a test pilot (subsequent to his prior flight test activities associated with the F-86E), graduating in December 1954 from the Empire Test Pilots' School at Farnborough, England. He participated in the testing of the Century Series of fighter aircraft (F-100 Super Sabre, F-101 Voodoo, F-102 Delta Dagger, F-104 Starfighter, F-105 Thunderchief, and F-106 Delta Dart).

For this he was nicknamed "America's . (However, this altitude is below the Kármán line, the threshold for "space" later established by the Fédération aéronautique internationale, as well as below the 50-mile-boundary used by the U.S. Air Force.) He was awarded the Mackay Trophy for 1956 for the flight.

The X-2 program was halted three weeks later, after a crash resulted in the death of Mel Apt in a flight in which he became the first person to exceed Mach 3. Kincheloe was later selected as one of the first three pilots in the next rocket-powered aircraft program, the X-15, and would have been part of the Man in Space Soonest project.

Death and legacy
In July 1958, Kincheloe was killed in the crash of an F-104A (Lockheed F-104A-10-LO s/n 56-772) at Edwards Air Force Base; he had ejected at low altitude, but given that the early F-104 used a downwards catapulted ejection seat   the deployed parachute did not adequately slow his descent. He was buried with full military honors at Arlington National Cemetery. Only thirty years old, Kincheloe was survived by wife, Dorothy, their young son, Iven III, and a daughter who was born two months later, Jeannine.
 On September 25, 1959, Kincheloe Air Force Base in Michigan's Upper Peninsula was renamed in his honor; formerly Kinross Air Force Base, it closed in 1977.
 A monument stands approximately 1½ miles (2½ km) east of his hometown of Cassopolis, Michigan; an angular stone slab  in height, it bears a silver model of the X-2 pointed skyward.
 Kincheloe Elementary School, part of the nearby Dowagiac Union School District, is named in his honor.
 The television program Hogan's Heroes included a character named Staff Sergeant James Kinchloe, played by Ivan Dixon.
 In 1992, he was inducted into the Aerospace Walk of Honor.
 In 2011, he was inducted into the National Aviation Hall of Fame.
 The Society of Experimental Test Pilots Iven C. Kincheloe Award is named in his honor.
 The Purdue University Arnold Air Society squadron is named in his honor.

Awards and decorations

Silver Star citation

Kincheloe, Iven C.
Captain U.S. Air Force
25th Fighter-Interceptor Squadron, 51st Fighter-Interceptor Group, Fifth Air Force
Date of Action:  April 1, 1952

Citation:

See also

S.A Rafiqui
 List of Korean War air aces
 Elmer W. Harris, fellow Korean squadron pilot

 Notes 

References

External links

 Korean War Aces
 USAF Museum
 Story about exploits @ CombatSim

 Photograph of Kincheloe with other pilots of his squadron wearing red caps and scarves, "Sabres and Aces", Air Force Magazine'', September 2006, p. 81.
 Iven C. Kincheloe Jr.  at the National Aviation Hall of Fame
 Astronautix biography of Iven C. Kincheloe Jr.
 Iven C. Kincheloe Jr. Photograph of his grave marker at Arlington National Cemetery, with brief biography.

1928 births
1958 deaths
Accidental deaths in California
American Korean War flying aces
American test pilots
Aviators from Michigan
American aerospace engineers
Aviators killed in aviation accidents or incidents in the United States
United States Air Force personnel of the Korean War
Burials at Arlington National Cemetery
Mackay Trophy winners
People from Cassopolis, Michigan
Purdue University School of Aeronautics and Astronautics alumni
Recipients of the Silver Star
Recipients of the Legion of Merit
Recipients of the Distinguished Flying Cross (United States)
Recipients of the Air Medal
United States Air Force officers
Flight altitude record holders
American aviation record holders
20th-century American engineers
Victims of aviation accidents or incidents in 1958
Military personnel from Michigan